Old Town, North Carolina may refer to:

Old Town, Brunswick County, North Carolina, United States
Old Town, Forsyth County, North Carolina, United States
Old Town Township, Forsyth County, North Carolina

See also
Old Fort, North Carolina, United States
Old Town (disambiguation)